José Pablo Tiscornia Baptista (born 15 February 1974, in Montevideo) is a Uruguayan manager and former footballer. He is currently assistant manager of River Plate.

Club career
Born in Montevideo, Tiscornia began playing football with local side River Plate where he made his debut in the Primera División Uruguaya in 1999.

Coaching career
After working as a youth coach for some years for River Plate, he was promoted to manager of the first team on 28 September 2016 until the end of the year, after the dismissal of Juan Ramón Carrasco. From the new year, he returned to coaching the youth sector but in March 2017, he was appointed manager of the first team once again. He left the club on 28 August 2018.

On 30 January 2019, he was appointed manager of Tacuarembó. He left the position at the end of May 2019.

On 3 September 2019, Tiscornia returned to Juventud as the club's new manager.

References

1974 births
Living people
Uruguayan footballers
Association football forwards
Club Atlético River Plate (Montevideo) players
C.S. Herediano footballers
C.S. Cartaginés players
C.D. Luis Ángel Firpo footballers
Cerro Largo F.C. players
C.A. Rentistas players
Juventud de Las Piedras players
Expatriate footballers in Guatemala
River Plate Montevideo managers
Expatriate footballers in Costa Rica
Expatriate footballers in El Salvador
Uruguayan football managers
Juventud de Las Piedras managers